Bree Nicole Turner (born March 10, 1977) is an American actress and dancer; she is best known for her role as Rosalee Calvert on Grimm.

Early life
Turner was born March 10, 1977, in Palo Alto, California and grew up in Alamo, California. Her father is former NFL linebacker Kevin Turner. In 1995, she graduated from Monte Vista High School in Danville, California, where she was voted 1994 Homecoming Queen. She then attended King's College London and University of California, Los Angeles.

Career
Turner landed her first speaking role in Deuce Bigalow: Male Gigolo. That same year, she was cast on MTV's late night anthology series, Undressed. She also did TV commercials for Gap "Khaki Country" and "Khaki-a-go-go," and for Dr. Pepper.

Turner was a background dancer in feature films as The Big Lebowski (1998), She's All That (1999) and Austin Powers: The Spy Who Shagged Me (1999). She had roles in The Wedding Planner (2001), Joe Dirt (2001), American Pie 2 (2001), and the starring role of head cheerleader in Bring It On Again (2004).

Turner has also appeared in independent films, including the musical and romantic drama True Vinyl (2000) and the wrestling drama Backyard Dogs.

Turner has worked in television, with recurring roles on the UPN sitcom Moesha, the ABC sitcom Spin City, the CBS drama Cold Case, guest starred on the UPN drama Sex, Love & Secrets and starred in the pilot episode ("Incident On and Off a Mountain Road") of Showtime's horror/thriller series Masters of Horror.

Turner has also acted on stage, playing Ivy in The Pages of My Diary I'd Rather Not Read at Hudson Mainstage Theater in Los Angeles in January 2003.

As of 2017, Turner finished her sixth season on the NBC drama series Grimm, portraying the character Rosalee Calvert. The part was a recurring role in season 1, moving to the main cast from season 2 onwards.

Personal life
In 2008, Turner married orthopedic surgeon Justin Saliman at the Casa Del Mar hotel in Santa Monica, California. They have a daughter named Stella Jean (born June 29, 2010), and a son named Dean (born September 12, 2012). In March 2018, Turner filed for divorce citing irreconcilable differences.

Filmography

Film

Television

References

External links

1977 births
Living people
Alumni of King's College London
Actresses from California
American female dancers
Dancers from California
American film actresses
American television actresses
Actresses from Palo Alto, California
20th-century American actresses
21st-century American actresses
People from Alamo, California